MBS, short for Le Micro Brise Le Silence (the microphone breaks the silence) is a rap group formed in 1988 in Algeria. They sing in Arabic, Kabyle, French they are led by Rabah Ourrad. Their lyrics mostly speak out against the Algerian government.

Discography 
1997, Ouled al Bahdja (Children of the Radiant One)
1998, Hbibti Aouama (My Lover Is a Good Swimmer)
1999, Le Micro Brise Le Silence (The Mic Breaks the Silence)
2001, Wellew (They Have Returned)
2005, Maquis Bla Sleh (Marquis Without Weapons)

Rabah (solo)
2002, Galouli (They Told Me)
2003, Djabha gagant (Winning Front)
2004, President
2011, Dernier Cri (Last Cry)

References

External links
"Algerian Hip Hop", from Islam Online
9@home Blog entry
MBS on rapdumaghreb.com
MBS auf culturebase.net

Algerian hip hop musicians
Musical groups established in 1988
Algerian rappers